Nancy Riche may refer to:
The Ex president of the New Democratic Party
A victim of the Our Lady of the Angels School Fire who died in Room 208